The Charles E. White House is a historic house at 101 Billings Road in Quincy, Massachusetts.  This -story wood-frame house was built c. 1905 by Charles White, a traveling salesman.  It is a well-preserved local example of late Shingle styling, with a cross-gable roof configuration and a side-hall entry plan.  It has a number of projecting bay windows, and a gable window set in a curved recess.  Its original shingling has been either covered or replaced by modern siding (see photo).

The house was listed on the National Register of Historic Places in 1989.

See also
National Register of Historic Places listings in Quincy, Massachusetts

References

Queen Anne architecture in Massachusetts
Houses in Quincy, Massachusetts
Houses completed in 1905
National Register of Historic Places in Quincy, Massachusetts
Houses on the National Register of Historic Places in Norfolk County, Massachusetts
Shingle Style houses
1905 establishments in Massachusetts
Shingle Style architecture in Massachusetts